Clinidium moldenkei is a species of ground beetle in the subfamily Rhysodinae. It was described by R.T. Bell & J.R. Bell in 1985. It is endemic to the Golfo Dulce region in Puntarenas Province, Costa Rica. The species is named for the coleopterist Andrew R. Moldenke, collector of the holotype.

Clinidium moldenkei measure  in length.

References

Clinidium
Beetles of Central America
Endemic fauna of Costa Rica
Beetles described in 1985